Rishabh Sinha is an Indian actor. He is known for playing the role of Ayaan Ahmed Khan in Qubool Hai, participating  in MTV Splitsvilla and Bigg Boss 9. He also played a negative role in the movie Kaanchi: The Unbreakable.

Filmography

Television

References

External links 

 
 

Living people
Bigg Boss contestants
1988 births